is a passenger railway station located in the town of Higashimiyoshi, Miyoshi District, Tokushima Prefecture, Japan. It is operated by JR Shikoku and has the station number "B22".

Lines
Besides local trains, the Tsurugisan limited express service also stops at Awa-Kamo.

Layout
The station consists of an island platform serving two tracks. Two sidings branch off the main tracks. Access to the island platform is by means of a footbridge. JR Shikoku closed its ticket window in 2010 but a municipal information centre was set on the station premises in 2012 who sells some types of tickets as a kan'i itaku agent.

Platforms

Adjacent stations

History
With the privatization of Japanese National Railways (JNR), the successor to JGR, on 1 April 1987, Awa-Kamo came under the control of JR Shikoku. On 1 June 1988, the line was renamed the Tokushima Line.

Surrounding area
Japan National Route 192
Higashimiyoshi Town Hall

See also
 List of Railway Stations in Japan

References

External links

 JR Shikoku timetable

Railway stations in Tokushima Prefecture
Railway stations in Japan opened in 1914
Higashimiyoshi, Tokushima